is a retired Japanese Greco-Roman wrestler. He won a silver medal at the 1974 Asian Games and finished in seventh place at the 1984 Summer Olympics.

References

External links
 

1952 births
Living people
Olympic wrestlers of Japan
Wrestlers at the 1984 Summer Olympics
Japanese male sport wrestlers
Asian Games medalists in wrestling
Wrestlers at the 1974 Asian Games
Asian Games silver medalists for Japan
Medalists at the 1974 Asian Games
20th-century Japanese people
21st-century Japanese people